Manuel Fernando Zurita was President of Nicaragua in 1950.

Zurita later served in the Chamber of Deputies of Nicaragua and was twice the president of the chamber - 1941 and 1949. He was serving in the chamber at the time of Somoza's death in 1956 and was the representative of the Chamber at Somoza's funeral.

In 1958 Zurita was appointed the Nicaraguan ambassador to Spain.

References

Possibly living people
Presidents of Nicaragua
Nicaraguan people of Basque descent
Year of birth missing
Place of birth missing
Nationalist Liberal Party politicians
Presidents of the Chamber of Deputies (Nicaragua)
Ambassadors of Nicaragua to Spain